The women's 25 metre pistol competition at the 2004 Summer Olympics was held on August 18 at the Markópoulo Olympic Shooting Centre near Athens, Greece.

The event consisted of two rounds: a qualifier and a final. In the qualifier, each shooter fired 60 shots with a pistol at 25 metres distance. Scores for each shot were in increments of 1, with a maximum score of 10. The first 30 shots were in the precision stage, with series of 5 shots being shot within 5 minutes. The second set of 30 shots gave shooters 3 seconds to take each shot.

The top 8 shooters in the qualifying round moved on to the final round. There, they fired an additional 20 shots. These shots scored in increments of .1, with a maximum score of 10.9. They were fired in four sets of 5 rapid fire shots.

Bulgaria's Mariya Grozdeva smashed a new Olympic record at 688.2 to defend her title in sport pistol shooting, putting her ahead of 19-year-old eventual silver medalist Lenka Hyková of the Czech Republic (687.8) by just a 0.4-point lead. Meanwhile, Azerbaijan's Irada Ashumova, who had notched the first seed earlier in the prelims, claimed the bronze with 687.3 points.

Records
Prior to this competition, the existing world and Olympic records were as follows.

Qualification round

PR — Precision stage; RF — Rapid fire stage

Final
In 2001, 25 metre pistol final shooting switched to rapid fire style. During this single Olympiad, only two rapid fire series were fired in the finals.

References

External links
Official Results

Women's 25 m Pistol
Olymp
Women's events at the 2004 Summer Olympics